Search and rescue (SAR) is the search for and provision of aid to people who are in distress or imminent danger. The general field of search and rescue includes many specialty sub-fields, typically determined by the type of terrain the search is conducted over. These include mountain rescue; ground search and rescue, including the use of search and rescue dogs; urban search and rescue in cities; combat search and rescue on the battlefield and air-sea rescue over water.

International Search and Rescue Advisory Group (INSARAG) is a UN organization that promotes the exchange of information between national urban search and rescue organizations. The duty to render assistance is covered by Article 98 of the UNCLOS.

Definitions
There are many different definitions of search and rescue, depending on the agency involved and country in question.

Canadian Forces: "Search and Rescue comprises the search for, and provision of aid to, persons, ships or other craft which are, or are feared to be, in distress or imminent danger."
United States Coast Guard: "The use of available resources to assist persons or property in potential or actual distress."
United States Defense Department: A search is "an operation normally coordinated by a Rescue Coordination Center (RCC) or rescue sub-center, using available personnel and facilities to locate persons in distress" and rescue is "an operation to retrieve persons in distress, provide for their initial medical or other needs, and deliver them to a place of safety".

History

One of the world's earliest well-documented SAR efforts ensued following the 1656 wreck of the Dutch merchant ship Vergulde Draeck off the west coast of Australia.  Survivors sought help, and in response three separate SAR missions were conducted, without success.

On 29 November 1945, a Sikorsky R-5 performed the first civilian helicopter rescue operation in history, with Sikorsky's chief pilot Dmitry "Jimmy" Viner in the cockpit, using an experimental hoist developed jointly by Sikorsky and Breeze.  All five crew members of an oil barge, which had run aground on Penfield Reef, were saved before the barge sank.

In 1983, Korean Air Lines Flight 007 with 269 occupants was shot down by a Soviet aircraft near Sakhalin. The Soviets sent SAR helicopters and boats to Soviet waters, while a search and rescue operation was initiated by U.S., South Korean, and Japanese ships and aircraft in international waters, but no survivors were found.

In July 2009, Air France Flight 447 was lost in the middle of the Atlantic Ocean.  An international SAR effort was launched, to no avail.  A third effort nearly two years later discovered the crash site and recovered the flight recorders.

In early 2014, Malaysia Airlines Flight 370 crashed under mysterious circumstances.  Many nations contributed to the initial SAR effort, which was fruitless.  In June 2014, the Australian Transport Safety Bureau commissioned the MV Fugro Equator to lead a three-month survey of the ocean bed. , the search for Flight 370 had become the largest SAR to date.

Types of search and rescue

Ground (lowland) search and rescue

Ground search and rescue is the search for persons who are lost or in distress on land or inland waterways. People may go missing for a variety of reasons. Some may disappear voluntarily, due to issues like domestic abuse. Others disappear for involuntary reasons such as mental illness, getting lost, an accident, death in a location where they cannot be found or, less commonly, due to abduction. Ground search and rescue missions that occur in urban areas should not be confused with "urban search and rescue", which in many jurisdictions refers to the location and extraction of people from collapsed buildings or other entrapments.

In some countries, the police are the primary agency for carrying out searches for a missing person on land. Some places have voluntary search and rescue teams that can be called out to assist these searches.

Search and rescue agencies may contain small specialist teams for executing operations where there are specific environmental risks. Examples include swift water rescue, flood response, technical rope rescue, confined space rescue, over-snow rescue, and thin ice rescue.

Mountain rescue

Mountain rescue relates to search and rescue operations specifically in rugged and mountainous terrain.

Cave rescue

Cave rescue is a highly specialized form of rescue for rescuing injured, trapped or lost cave explorers.

Urban search and rescue

Urban search and rescue (US&R or USAR), also referred to as Heavy Urban Search and Rescue (HUSAR), is the location and rescue of persons from collapsed buildings or other urban and industrial entrapments. Due to the specialized nature of the work, most teams are multi-disciplinary and include personnel from police, fire and emergency medical services. Unlike traditional ground search and rescue workers, most US&R responders also have basic training in structural collapse and the dangers associated with live electrical wires, broken natural gas lines and other hazards. While earthquakes have traditionally been the cause of US&R operations, terrorist attacks and extreme weather such as tornadoes and hurricanes have also resulted in the deployment of these resources.

Combat search and rescue

Combat search and rescue (CSAR) is search and rescue operations that are carried out during war that are within or near combat zones.

Maritime search and rescue

Maritime search and rescue is carried out at sea to save sailors and passengers in distress, or the survivors of downed aircraft. The type of agency which carries out maritime search and rescue varies by country; it may variously be the coast guard, navy or voluntary organizations. When a distressed or missing vessel is located, these organizations deploy helicopters, rescue vessels or any other appropriate vessel to return them to land. In some cases, the agencies may carry out an air-sea rescue (ASR). This refers to the combined use of aircraft (such as flying boats, floatplanes, amphibious helicopters and non-amphibious helicopters equipped with hoists) and surface vessels. The International Convention on Maritime Search and Rescue (SAR Convention) is the legal framework that applies to international maritime and air-sea rescue.

By nation

Australia

National
The Australian search and rescue service is provided by three authorities; the Joint Rescue Coordination Centre (JRCC) at the Australian Maritime Safety Authority (AMSA), the Australian Defence Force (ADF) and the State/Territory Police Jurisdictions.  In a very broad sense, the JRCC respond to national and international registered aircraft, off shore marine incidents and beacon activations. The ADF are responsible for Australian and foreign military personnel, vehicles, vessels and aircraft while within the Australian SRR.  Police are responsible for coastal marine incidents, lost persons, unregistered aircraft, inland waterways, ports and identified beacons. The JRCC operates a 24-hour Rescue Coordination Centre (RCC) in Canberra and is responsible for the national coordination of both maritime and aviation search and rescue. The JRCC is also responsible for the management and operation of the Australian ground segment of the Cospas-Sarsat distress beacon detection system. The JRCC's jurisdiction spans Australia and as well as covering 52.8 million square kilometres of the Indian, Pacific and Southern Oceans constituting about 11% of the Earth's surface.

The JRCC is staffed by SAR specialists who have a naval, merchant marine, air force, civil aviation or police service background. The JRCC also coordinates medical evacuations, broadcasts maritime safety information and operates the Australian Ship Reporting System (AUSREP). In coordinating search and rescue missions, the JRCC will call on assistance from organisations as appropriate, such as the Defence forces, Border Protection Command, trained aviation organisations (Civil SAR Units), emergency medical helicopters, state Police services and trained Air Observers from the State Emergency Service. There are also other organisations, such as the non-profit Westpac Life Saver Rescue Helicopter Service that is based at a number of sites around Australia and contracted by various authorities to deliver search and rescue services.

State

State Police in many states operate state-based search and rescue squads, such as the Victoria Police Search and Rescue Squad, which provides specialist expertise, advice and practical assistance in land search and rescue on most terrain including snow and vertical cliff search and rescue. There are also state-based volunteer search and rescue groups such as the NSW SES Bush Search and Rescue in New South Wales and Bush Search and Rescue Victoria in Victoria. These state-based groups draw searchers from bushwalking, mountaineering and specialist rescue clubs within their State.  A few groups respond on horseback as mounted search and rescue. The State Emergency Service is a collection of volunteer-based emergency organisations established in each state or territory which are responsible for many rescue efforts in urban and rural areas and in any rescue that results from flood or storm activity. In rural areas the SES conducts most bush search, vertical and road traffic rescues. In urban areas they assist the police and fire services with USAR.

Azerbaijan
Search and rescue operations in Azerbaijan are managed by the Ministry of Emergency Situations onshore in cooperation with the State Civil Aviation Administration in air and the State Maritime Administration offshore.

Belgium
Search and rescue duties along the Belgian part of the North Sea are executed by the Belgian Air Component. From its Koksijde Air Base it operates 5 Westland Sea King Mk.48 helicopters.

Brazil
Search and rescue duties in Brazil are the responsibility of the Salvarmar Brasil (MRCC Brazil), of the Brazilian Navy and Divisão de Busca e Salvamento (D-SAR) (English: Search and Rescue Division), of the Brazilian Air Force.

Canada

Air and marine Search and rescue duties in Canada are the responsibility of the Canadian Forces and Canadian Coast Guard in conjunction with volunteer organizations. The Department of National Defence (DND) has overall responsibility for the coordinated search and rescue system. SAR operations are organized by Joint Rescue Coordination Centres (JRCC). The JRCC are staffed 24 hours a day by SAR Co-ordinators from the Canadian Coast Guard and Canadian Forces. Authority for the provision of maritime SAR is assigned to the Minister of Fisheries and Oceans by the Canada Shipping Act and the Canada Oceans Act. Ground and inland water search and rescue (GSAR) is the responsibility of provinces and territories with the Royal Canadian Mounted Police (RCMP) and other police forces coordinating operations, often using volunteer GSAR teams operating in specific areas under provincial coordinating bodies.

The Canada Shipping Act, most recently passed in 2001, is the framework document that funds international SAR activities.

The Canadian Forces have five assigned SAR squadrons:

103 Search and Rescue Squadron, CFB Gander, CH-149 Cormorant
413 Transport and Rescue Squadron, CFB Greenwood, CH-149 Cormorant & CC-130 Hercules
424 Transport and Rescue Squadron, CFB Trenton, CH-146 Griffon & CC-130 Hercules
435 Transport and Rescue Squadron, CFB Winnipeg, CC-130 Hercules
442 Transport and Rescue Squadron, CFB Comox, CH-149 Cormorant & CC-115 Buffalo

Plus three Combat Support Squadrons with SAR roles:

417 Combat Support Squadron, CFB Cold Lake, CH-146 Griffon
439 Combat Support Squadron, CFB Bagotville, CH-146 Griffon
444 Combat Support Squadron, CFB Goose Bay, CH-146 Griffon

Some municipalities and provinces have their own SAR units:
 Halton Regional Police Service Marine Unit - using marine craft on Lake Ontario
 Toronto Police Service Marine Unit - using marine craft on Lake Ontario
 Peel Regional Police Marine Unit - using marine craft on Lake Ontario and rivers in Peel Region
 Ontario Provincial Police Marine Unit - using marine craft on Great Lakes (excluding Lake Michigan) and Georgian Bay
 Durham Regional Police Marine Unit - using marine craft on Lake Ontario and lakes within Durham Region
 York Regional Police Marine Unit - using marine craft on Lake Simcoe
 Niagara Regional Police Marine Unit - using marine craft on Niagara River and Lake Ontario
 Vancouver Police Department - using marine craft on waterways around the City of Vancouver
 Heavy Urban Search and Rescue (Toronto) - using land base equipment
 Brockville Police Service Marine Patrol Unit - using a boat on the St. Lawrence River
There are also volunteer non-profit associations that conduct SAR in Canada:
 British Columbia, there are 80 community based volunteer Groups in B.C. providing GSAR services within assigned areas in conjunction with Police, ambulance and other agencies. The GSAR Groups are represented by the British Columbia Search and Rescue Association
 Alberta / BC Cave Rescue, Alberta/British Columbia
 Canada Task Force 2, Alberta
 Civil Air Search and Rescue Association
 ERT Search and Rescue
 Grande Prairie Technical Search and Rescue Association, Alberta
 Halifax Regional Search and Rescue - Nova Scotia
 North Shore Rescue, British Columbia.
 Pincher Creek Search and Rescue, Alberta
 Québec Secours, Québec.
 River Valley Ground Search and Rescue, New Brunswick
 Roberts Bank Lifeboat - Delta, BC
 Royal Canadian Marine Search and Rescue (RCM SAR)
 Sauvetage Bénévole Outaouais - Ottawa Volunteer Search and Rescue - Ottawa, ON and Gatineau, QC
 Search and Rescue Manitoba (SARMAN), Manitoba
 Vancouver Urban Search and Rescue (Canadian Task Force One), British Columbia
York Sunbury Search & Rescue - New Brunswick

Croatia

In Croatia the SAR Service is part of the Croatian Navy and the Croatian Coast Guard with their headquarter in Rijeka.

Cyprus

The Cyprus Republic Search and Rescue (SAR) system is organized by the Cyprus Joint Rescue Coordination Center (JRCC Larnaca).

The JRCC (Greek: Κέντρο Συντονισμού Έρευνας και Διάσωσης) is an independent agency of the Ministry of Defence of the Republic of Cyprus that started its operations on a 24h basis on 7 August 1995 as a unit of the Cyprus Air Force Command.

On 1 March 2002, the JRCC took full responsibility for investigating, organizing, coordinating and executing every SAR incident-operation in the Republic of Cyprus Search & Rescue Region (SRR). JRCC Larnaca operated as a military unit until 26 July 2010, when JRCC was transformed to an independent agency under the Ministry of Defence with the Minister being responsible for its operational aspects. Logistic and technical support is the responsibility of the Ministry of Communications & Works. Its primary mission is to organize the Cyprus Republic Search And Rescue system, to co-ordinate, control and direct SAR operations in its area of responsibility (which is identical to the Nicosia FIR), in order to find and rescue people whose lives are at risk, as a result of an air or naval accident, in the least possible time. This is achieved by coordinating all the different agencies involved such as the Cyprus Police Aviation Unit, the Cyprus Port and Naval Police, the Cyprus National Guard Naval Command, the Cyprus National Guard Air Force Command, the Cyprus Civil Defence and other secondary units.

The JRCC reports directly to the operational control of the Ministry of Defence and it is staffed by qualified personnel of the Cyprus National Guard, mainly from the branches of the Navy and the Air Force.

Northern Cyprus 
There are also search and rescue teams in Northern Cyprus. Search and rescue operators in Turkish Republic of North Cyprus are primarily:

 SSTB Civil Defence Organization Presidency  (Turkish : Sivil Savunma Teşkilat Başkanlığı)
 Emergency Management Committee
 DAK Search and Rescue in Natural Disasters (Turkish : Doğal Afetlerde Arama Kurtarma)
 AKUT TRNC

Military

 TRNC Coast Guard Command 
 TRNC Coastal Safety (police)
 Security Forces Command Search and rescue teams.

Denmark

Search and rescue operators in Denmark are primarily: Danish air force Squadron 722, Danish navy air squadron, naval home guard and the Danish Maritime Safety Administration, coordinated by the Joint Rescue Coordination Centre, operated by the navy and air force in the Danish Naval Commands facilities near Aarhus. Internationally the Danish works mainly with Germany, Norway and Sweden. With the two latter, the annual exercises Baltic SAREX and
Scan-SAR are conducted.

SAR services in Denmark started in 1957 with seven Sikorsky S-55s. Their piston engines produced only  and they had limited fuel capacity, so their operational range was short. To increase the operational area, Pembroke twin-engined fixed-wing aircraft were employed for search. These aircraft would localize the distressed person(s) and the S-55s would then rescue them. The SAR service was started for respond to fighter-plane crashes as 79 aircraft crashed, with 62 dead, in the period 1950–1955., but civilian SAR duties are also conducted.

In 1962, eight ship-based Aérospatiale Alouette IIIs were received. These were primarily meant for the ships patrolling the North Atlantic, but also supported the S-55s. In 19641965 the seven S-55s were replaced with eight Sikorsky S-61A helicopters.

In 2007, the Danish Defence held a public display in Horsens, to raise awareness about rescue services and maritime safety. Maritime SAR is important because Denmark has a relative long coast line to its land mass.

In 2008, the SAR forces in Denmark were equipped with eight EH-101, one or two Lynx, 34 naval home guard vessels and 21 rescue vessels, as well as the naval vessels at sea. The EH-101s operate from bases in Aalborg, Skrydstrup and Roskilde. When the sea water temperatures are low a helicopter is also deployed to the island of Bornholm in the Baltic Sea. The Lynx operates from Karup. Maritime vessels are spread out through the entire coastline and on islands. The S-61s and EH-101s have a crew of six: two pilots, a navigator, a flight engineer, a physician and a rescue swimmer.

Estonia

The Estonian Border Guard (Piirivalve) is the Estonian security authority responsible for the border security. It is the main support organisation for search and rescue missions in Estonia, and operates a small fleet of SAR vessels and helicopters.

Finland
In Finland local rescue services (i.e. fire departments) are responsible for land and inland water SAR, the Border Guard is responsible for maritime areas. These organizations alert and decide on the most suitable response for the location and situation.  The country also has several volunteer organizations such as the volunteer fire department (VPK), the Finnish Lifeboat Institution (SMPS) and the Red Cross Finland (SPR).

France

The Société Nationale de Sauvetage en Mer (SNSM) provides sea rescue on the French coast and at seas. In 2016, they helped 7,500 people in 5,200 rescues. The service has 41 all-weather rescue boats, 34 first-class rescue boats and 76 second-class lifeboats.

Germany

Search and Rescue in German waters is conducted by the German Maritime Search and Rescue Service with air support by the German Navy and the German Army Aviation. All incoming requests are coordinated by the Maritime Rescue Coordination Center in Bremen. The DGzRS is a non-governmental organization entirely supported by donations.

Besides the offshore Search And Rescue services, the German Army Aviation provides 3 SAR Command Posts on a 24/7 basis with the Bell UH-1D Huey at Holzdorf Air Base and the Airbus H145 LUH SAR (Light Utility Helicopter Search and Rescue) at Nörvenich Air Base and 2 at Niederstetten Army Airfield. 

Further, the Technisches Hilfswerk is a key component of the German disaster relief framework. It is, among other things, regularly involved in  urban search and rescue efforts abroad.

Hong Kong

 
SAR operations are conducted by the Government Flying Service (GFS) and before 1993 by the Royal Hong Kong Auxiliary Air Force. The GFS conducts maritime SAR within the  radius of the Hong Kong Flight Information Region (FIR).

As of 2020, the GFS fleet consists of nine aircraft including:
 2 Bombardier Challenger 605 - for aerial SAR surveillance
 7 Airbus Helicopters H175  - for inshore and offshore SAR

Other civilian search and rescue units in Hong Kong include:

 Civil Aid Service - works in conjunction with the Hong Kong Fire Services Dept and the air support from the Government Flying Service, also provides mountain rescue service
 Hong Kong Fire Services/Hong Kong Marine Police - various vessels and rescue divers  - with air support from the GFS
 Hong Kong Maritime Rescue Co-ordination Centre is responsible for coordinating other civil agencies in regards to marine SAR operations in waters around Hong Kong
 Countryside Volunteer Search Team

Iceland

The Icelandic Coast Guard is responsible for coordinating all maritime and aviation search and rescue activities in the Icelandic Search and Rescue Region (SRR), that has the size of 1.9 million square kilometres. The Icelandic Coast Guard operates JRCC ICELAND in combination with the Coast Guard's operation centre, the maritime traffic service and the coastal radio stations. If aircraft crash site is located on land the control of the rescue operations is diverted to the Icelandic Police, which is responsible for SAR operations on land. The Icelandic Coast Guard (JRCC ICELAND) is the Cospas-Sarsat SAR Point of Contact. ISAVIA, which operates the Air Traffic Control in Iceland, is responsible for the aviation alerting services. The Icelandic Coast Guard operates maritime patrol aircraft, SAR helicopters and patrol vessels.

The Icelandic Association for Search and Rescue (Slysavarnafélagið Landsbjörg) (ICESAR) is a volunteer organization with about 100 rescue teams located all around the island. ICESAR is a great support to SAR operations both on land and sea.  All the rescue teams contain groups of specially trained individuals.

A specialized INSARAG External Classification certified rubble rescue squad operates under the Icelandic Association of Search and Rescue. It was the first rescue squad to arrive in Haiti following the earthquake of 2010.

Indonesia
The National Search and Rescue Agency of Indonesia known in Indonesian as Badan Nasional Pencarian dan Pertolongan abbreviated "BASARNAS", is a government agency responsible for conducting search and rescue duties nationally in Indonesia. BASARNAS may also be assisted in conducting SAR in Indonesia by the TNI, Mobile Brigade Corps, and local Fire brigade units.

Ireland

Maritime SAR services are provided by two civilian bodies - the Irish Coast Guard and the RNLI. The Coast Guard has responsibility for the Irish Search and Rescue Region. The Royal National Lifeboat Institution has 43 lifeboat stations including inland stations at Enniskillen and Lough Derg,  the coastguard inshore rescue boats, and community rescue boats at fifteen stations: Ballinskelligs - Co. Kerry, Ballybunion - Co. Kerry, Ballyheigue - Co. Kerry, Banna - Co. Kerry, Bantry - Co. Cork, Bunmahon - Co. Waterford, Cahore - Co. Wexford, Carna - Co. Galway, Corrib/Mask Lakes - Co. Galway, Derrynane - Co. Kerry, Limerick City (River Shannon), Mallow Search and Rescue - Co. Cork, Schull - Co. Cork, Tramore - Co. Waterford, Waterford City River Rescue, Waterford Marine Search & Rescue. There are some 25 other independent rescue services.

Mountain Rescue in Ireland is provided by 12 voluntary teams based in different regions of the country.

The IRCG operate a number of contracted Sikorsky Search and Rescue helicopters from bases in Dublin, Waterford, Shannon and Sligo under the €500 million contract, from 2010, a previous fleet of Sikorsky S-61N helicopters were replaced with five newer Sikorsky S-92 helicopters. One of the new S-92 helicopters is located at each of the four IRCG bases, with one spare replacement aircraft being rotated between bases.

The Irish Coast Guard are launching a tender for a future SAR Aviation Contract, which is one of several tenders for similar services.

The Irish Air Corps provide top cover for search and rescue over land or sea and is available for maritime and mountain rescue if needed. The Irish Naval Service frequently assists the other agencies in search and rescue. Its patrol ships at sea and the communications center at Haulbowline maintain a 24-hour watch on all distress frequencies.

Israel

SAR in Israel is the responsibility of the IDF Home Front Command Search and Rescue (SAR). The unit was established at its current strength in 1984, combining all the specialist units that were involved with SAR until that time.

The SAR unit is a rapid mobilization force and has an airborne transport and deployment capability for its personnel and equipment. The unit is composed of reserve personnel, with a regular cadre based at the Bahad 16 Unit training facility. With a focus on urban SAR, the unit operates specialized equipment, including a locally developed device for locating persons trapped under rubble by detecting seismic and acoustic emissions given off by the victims. The SAR unit also uses Search and rescue dogs specially trained to locate people buried under debris.

Israeli SAR resources
Israel Defense Forces
Medical Corps (Israel)
Home Front Command
Bahad 16
Oketz Unit
Israel Police
IsraAid
Magen David Adom
ZAKA

Italy

Italian SAR operations are carried out by the Guardia Costiera, backed up by naval aviation and the air force, including Aeronautica Militare Comando 15° Stormo (15th Wing), the Italian Red Cross, and other organizations.

Jordan
Jordan's Civil Defense Urban Search and Rescue team (USAR) has achieved the UN classification as a heavy USAR team. The team's role mainly earthquake rescue.

Kenya
The Kenya Maritime Authority and the Kenya Civil Aviation Authority are responsible for Aeronautical SAR within Kenya's waterways and aerospace respectively.

Macau
Macau's maritime SAR is conducted by two units:

The Macau Marine Department and responsible for maritime SAR within Macau's waterways. The Macau Search and Rescue Coordination Centre is under the Vessel Traffic Control Centre of Macao of the Maritime Administration of Macau.

Malaysia 

For land rescue, Malaysia has two primary SAR units: the Special Malaysia Disaster Assistance and Rescue Team (SMART), which reports to the National Security Council, and the Malaysian Fire and Rescue Department's (FRDM) Special Tactical Operation and Rescue Team of Malaysia (STORM) unit. They are sometimes aided by the jungle experts, the aboriginal police unit named Senoi Praaq, Royal Malaysian Police (RMP) VAT 69 Commando, the Malaysian Armed Forces' special operations force, and the Malaysian Civil Defence Force. Both SMART and STORM, as with other FRDM's special operations, often participate in international SAR missions.

For maritime SAR, it is the responsibility of Malaysia Coast Guard and FRDM, along with support from the RMP's Marine Operations Force and the Royal Malaysian Air Force's PASKAU.

Malta

The responsibility for SAR at sea in the Malta Search and Rescue Region falls under the Armed Forces of Malta (AFM). It is carried out by maritime patrol aircraft, helicopters and vessels under the co-ordination, command and control of the Rescue Co-ordination Centre.

The AFM, in close collaboration with the US Coast Guard, also runs a Search and Rescue Training Centre for International Students in Maritime SAR Mission Co-ordination and Planning. To date more than 30 foreign students from 15 countries including Albania, Cameroon, Croatia, Equatorial Guinea and Kenya have attended these courses.

Malta is also in talks with Libya about enhancing SAR cooperation between the two countries.

Netherlands
SAR responsibility in the Netherlands is held by the Netherlands Coastguard, carried out by vessels and aircraft from various organisations among which mostly the Royal Netherlands Sea Rescue Institution, the Dutch Lifeguard Association, the Ministry of Transport and Water Management and the Ministry of Defence (Netherlands).

New Zealand
New Zealand's Search and Rescue Region extends from the South Pole to the southern border of the Honolulu region, including Norfolk, Tonga, Samoa, and Cook Islands.

Smaller searches are controlled by the local police, who call on LandSAR for land-based operations, such as for lost hikers known as tramping in New Zealand, and the Royal New Zealand Coastguard for coastal maritime incidents. Larger maritime search and rescue events, as well as reports of overdue aircraft, fall under the control of the Rescue Coordination Centre New Zealand (RCCNZ), based in Avalon, which coordinates response from local coastguard, helicopter operators, merchant marine, air force and naval resources.

Urban Search and Rescue falls primarily within the domain of the Fire and Emergency New Zealand, particularly the three USAR Taskforce groups based in Palmerston North, Christchurch, and Auckland. These teams draw together numerous specialists and organisations to achieve an integrated multi-agency response.

Among those organisations that act in a support capacity for FENZ are Response Teams (NZRTs). These are regional rescue groups of professional volunteers that train to a minimum industry standard of USAR Category 1R (USAR Responder), which is also standard for FENZ firefighters. Response Teams are registered with the Ministry of Civil Defence and Emergency Management (MCDEM), and assist their local MCDEM Groups and communities in emergencies to supplement full-time emergency services. Their additional capabilities, which vary among different teams, include: high angle rope rescue, storm response, swift water response, medics, welfare, and rural fire support. Many Response Teams were deployed to assist in the rescue and recovery effort of the 2011 Christchurch earthquake.

Other resources:
Westpac Rescue Helicopter (New Zealand) - charitable organization
New Zealand Land SAR Search Dogs - the official NZ search dogs group providing land search & rescue services under NZ Land SAR, wilderness and avalanche rescue dogs.

Norway

The search and rescue helicopters are operated by the Royal Norwegian Air Force (RNoAF), who fly 12 Westland Sea Kings. The Norwegian Sea Kings are in the process of being replaced. Between 2020 and 2023 the Sea King fleet will have been phased out by 16 AgustaWestland AW101, named Sar Queen for the purpose. There have been issues with the phasing in of Sar Queen, due to landing sites across the country not being sized for the increased downwash.

Philippines
The agencies responsible for Search and Rescue activities in the Philippines are:

 Philippine Coast Guard
 Office of Civil Defense
 National Disaster Risk Reduction and Management Council

Portugal 

Three different agencies are responsible for providing search and rescue in Portugal. The Portuguese Navy is responsible for all sea rescues, the Portuguese Air Force for all the rescues originating within the airspace, including aircraft crashes and the Autoridade Nacional de Protecção Civil (ANPC) for all inland rescues. All of the above coordinate closely with each other providing a comprehensive search and rescue service.

The Portuguese area of responsibility comprises the Lisbon and Santa Maria Flight Information Regions (FIR).

Poland

In Poland most search and rescue operations are undertaken by the airborne units of the Polish Armed Forces. The Navy currently has the largest SAR fleet of helicopters and also operates a number of small vessels for the purpose of rescuing crewmen of stricken ships. There is also, however a semi-governmental organisation known as the 'Morska Służba Poszukiwania i Ratownictwa' (Maritime Search and Rescue Service) which provides the vast majority of seaborne services to vessels in distress; the service is currently (as of 2010) in the process of overhauling and replacing a large portion of its fleet of lifeboats.

Other civilian search and rescue units in Poland include:

 Górskie Ochotnicze Pogotowie Ratunkowe, GOPR (Mountain Volunteer Search and Rescue)
 Tatrzańskie Ochotnicze Pogotowie Ratunkowe, TOPR (Tatra Mountains Volunteer Search and Rescue)
 Wodne Ochotnicze Pogotowie Ratunkowe, WOPR (Water Volunteer Search and Rescue) - operating on inland and coastal waters

South Africa 
Search and Rescue services are offered by various government departments, non governmental organizations, commercial/private organizations and voluntary organizations organisations in South Africa. There is no single organisation responsible for urban, wilderness, swift water, aviation or maritime/sea rescue.

Aviation and maritime incidents are the responsibility of the South African Search and Rescue Organization (SASAR). SASAR is a voluntary organization that functions under the auspices of the Department of Transport. Its main role is to search for, assist and carry out rescue operations for the survivors of aircraft or vessel accidents. Depending on the nature of the accident, the RCC's (ARCC or MRCC) coordinate the search and rescue missions. These operations are carried out by other government departments, non governmental organizations, commercial/private organizations and voluntary organizations.

Local resources:
 National Sea Rescue Institute
 Wilderness Search and Rescue Cape Town
 The Mountain Club of South Africa Search and Rescue
 Search and Rescue South Africa
 Rescue South Africa
 K9 Search and Rescue
 Metro Search and Rescue

Spain

Search and rescue duties in Spain are the responsibility of the national government, in conjunction with regional and municipal governments. The Sociedad de Salvamento y Seguridad Marítima is the main organization, and has overall responsibility for the maritime search and rescue, that also coordinates the SAR efforts with other agencies:

 Spanish Navy
 Spanish Air Force
 Servicio de Vigilancia Aduanera
 Servicio Marítimo de la Guardia Civil

Sweden 

The Swedish Maritime Administration is responsible for maritime SAR in Swedish waters. The Swedish Sea Rescue Society is an organization aiming at saving lives and recovering property at sea, much the same as the Norwegian Norsk Selskab til Skibbrudnes Redning. The society operates 68 search and rescue stations and some 185 ships crewed by 2100 volunteers, of those more than 300 are on call at any time, and can respond within 15 minutes. In 2011, the volunteers turned out to an emergency 3274 times. The Swedish Sea Rescue Society is involved 70% of the number SAR missions in Swedish waters.

Switzerland

REGA (Schweizerische REttungsflugwacht / Garde Aérienne / Guardia Aerea) is the air rescue service which provides emergency medical assistance in Switzerland, notably in mountains but also in cases of life-threatening emergencies elsewhere. They will also return a citizen to Switzerland from a foreign country if they are in need of urgent medical care. Rega was established on 27 April 1952 by Dr. Rudolf Bucher, who thought that the Swiss rescue organisation needed a specialised air sub-section.

Taiwan
National Airborne Service Corps (NASC) is the agency of the Ministry of the Interior of the Republic of China responsible for executing and providing support for search and rescue, disaster relief, emergency medical service, transportation, monitoring, reconnaissance and patrol in Taiwan.

Coast Guard Administration (CGA) is charged with maintaining coastal waters and the pelagic zone patrols, smuggling and stowaway crackdowns, maritime rescues, natural resource conservation, and public services. The CGA is considered a civilian law enforcement agency under the administration of the Executive Yuan, though during emergencies it may be incorporated as part of the Republic of China Armed Forces.

Turkey 

Search and Rescue operators in Turkey are primarily:

Civil governmental and non-governmental organizations

 Disaster and Emergency Management Presidency; also known as AFAD
 AKUT Search and Rescue Association
National Medical Rescue Team (UMKE)
 GEA Search and Rescue Association is a group of search and rescue, ecology and social campaigners, founded in 1994, made up of volunteer members.
AKDF Search and Rescue Associations Federation was established in nineteen different districts.
 AKA
 Search and Rescue and Emergency Aid Association (AKAY)
AKUT 
 Middle East Search and Rescue, Mountaineering and Outdoor Sports Association (ORDOS)
 NAK
 National Emergency Search and Rescue Association (NESAR)
Military

 Gendarmerie Search and Rescue Battalion Command (JAK)
Gendarmerie Underwater Search and Rescue Teams (SAK)
 Diving, Safety, Security, Search and Rescue Team
 Air Force Search and Rescue
Coast Guard Command (Turkey)  Turkish Coast Guard is also the main Search and Rescue Coordination Authority in Turkish SAR Zone

Ukraine
In Ukraine search and rescue is conducted by the State Search and Rescue Aviation Service of the Ministry of Emergencies of Ukraine Ukraviaposhuk.

United Kingdom

In the UK, land-based searches for a missing person are usually coordinated by the local police. There is a network of local volunteer agencies that can be called out to assist these searches, which are part of the Association of Lowland Search And Rescue. Other voluntary agencies exist to provide specialist search and rescue services, such as the Cave Rescue Organisation and Mountain Rescue Committee of Scotland. These organisations are usually called out indirectly by the police. For example, the British Cave Rescue Council advises that if someone goes missing in a cave, callers should contact the local police who will then summon cave rescue. Urban search and rescue units are run by the fire services.

His Majesty's Coastguard are in charge of maritime search and rescue missions. The Coastguard is one of the four emergency services that can be contacted on 999. Their role is to initiate and coordinate the searches. Lifeboats are provided by volunteer agencies, most often by the Royal National Lifeboat Institution. Aircraft for an air-sea rescue were originally provided by the Royal Navy and Royal Air Force. Under the programme UK-SAR, they are now operated under contract by Bristow Helicopters.  The Maritime & Coastguard Agency are launching a tender for their second generation UK search and rescue aviation programme (UKSAR2G), which is one of several tenders for similar services.

Examples of local resources include:
Berkshire Lowland Search and Rescue
Cardiff and Vale Rescue Association
Cave Rescue Organisation
Emergency Response Team Search and Rescue
Mercia Inshore Search and Rescue
Scarborough and Ryedale Mountain Rescue Team
Surrey Search and Rescue
Severn Area Rescue Association
Upper Wharfedale Fell Rescue Association
West Mercia Search and Rescue

United States 

In the United States there are many organizations with SAR responsibilities at the national, state and local level. Most day-to-day SAR missions in the US are run by the County Sheriffs, except in states like Alaska, where the State Highway Patrol oversees SAR. They in turn, can request help from state and national resources, if they think they need them. A typical Sheriff's Office has a volunteer SAR team that matches the terrain and population of that county. SAR members are typically trained in the Incident Command System (ICS), first aid, and the outdoor skills needed in that terrain and climate. Most of this article is about the federal response to assist large complicated SAR missions.

In January 2008, the United States Department of Homeland Security (DHS) released the National Response Framework which serves as the guiding document for a federal response during a national emergency.  Search and Rescue is divided into 4 primary elements, while assigning a federal agency with the lead role for each of the 4 elements.
 Structural Collapse-USAR: Department of Homeland Security Federal Emergency Management Agency
 Waterborne: United States Coast Guard, United States Coast Guard Auxiliary
 Inland-wilderness: United States Department of Interior, National Park Service
 Aeronautical: United States Air Force via the Air Force Rescue Coordination Center and USAF rescue wings, groups and squadrons in the Air Combat Command, Pacific Air Forces (for Alaska and Hawaii), Air Education and Training Command, Air Force Reserve Command and the Air National Guard; the Civil Air Patrol in its role as the USAF Auxiliary; and the United States Navy and United States Marine Corps, both Active and Reserve (secondary missions for land-based USN maritime patrol and reconnaissance squadrons and land-based and sea-based USN/USMC helicopter squadrons)

SAR standards adopted by agencies having jurisdiction are developed primarily by non-governmental organizations, including ASTM International and National Fire Protection Association.  These standards are adopted also by training and certification organizations such as Mountain Rescue Association and National Association for Search and Rescue to develop training that will meet or exceed those standards. Within ASTM International, standards specific to SAR are developed by Technical Committee F32 on Search and Rescue. Formed in 1988, the committee had 85 current members and jurisdiction of 38 approved standards.

Vietnam
Under command of the Central Government:
 National Committee of Search and Rescue is responsible for searching, rescuing and disaster relief.
 Central Committee of Prevention of Natural Disasters is responsible for analyzing information and monitoring disaster relief processes.

Under command of local People's Committee:
 Each province and municipality has a Provincial or City Committee of Prevention of Natural Disaster

Under command of the Ministry of Defense:
 General Staff: Department of Rescue of Vietnam People's Army is responsible for coordinating all military rescue activities (including ground force rescue activities).
 Navy: Office of Rescue of Vietnam People's Navy is responsible for coordinating naval rescue activities.
 Air Force: Office of Rescue of Vietnam People's Air Force is responsible for coordinating air force rescue activities. 
 Coast Guard: Office of Rescue of Vietnam Coast Guard is responsible for coordinating coastal rescue activities.
 Border Guard: Office of Rescue of Vietnam Border Defense Force is responsible for coordinating border rescue activities.

Under command of the Ministry of Public Security:
 Vietnam Fire and Rescue Police Department is responsible for fire fighting activities.

Under command of the Ministry of Transport:
 Department of Maritime Administration: Vietnam Maritime Search and Rescue Coordination Center (VMRCC) is responsible for maritime rescue activities. VMRCC is divided into 4 Rescue Regions:
 Vietnam Maritime Search and Rescue Coordination Center of Region I: operate in Tonkin Gulf 
 Vietnam Maritime Search and Rescue Coordination Center of Region II: operate in North Central sea
 Vietnam Maritime Search and Rescue Coordination Center of Region III: operate in Gulf of Thailand and Southern sea
 Vietnam Maritime Search and Rescue Coordination Center of Region IV: operate in South Central sea
 Corporation of Air Traffic Management: Vietnam Aviation Search and Rescue Coordination Center (VARCC) is responsible for air rescue activities. VARCC is divided into 3 Rescue Regions:
 Vietnam Aviation Search and Rescue Coordination Center of Northern Vietnam: operate in Northern region
 Vietnam Aviation Search and Rescue Coordination Center of Central Vietnam: operate in Central region
 Vietnam Aviation Search and Rescue Coordination Center of Southern Vietnam: operate in Southern region
 Vietnam Railway Rescue and Natural Calamity Response Center of Northern Vietnam: operates in Northern region
 Vietnam Railway Rescue and Natural Calamity Response Center of Central Vietnam: operates in Central region
 Vietnam Railway Rescue and Natural Calamity Response Center of Southern Vietnam: operates in Southern region

Aircraft

Rotary and fixed wing aircraft are used for air and sea rescue. A list of common aircraft used:

 Aérospatiale SA330 Puma
 Aérospatiale SA360 Dauphin
Airbus Helicopters H175
 AgustaWestland AW109
 AgustaWestland AW139
 AgustaWestland AW101
AgustaWestland CH-149 Cormorant
 Bell UH-1 Iroquois
Bell CH-146 Griffon
 Boeing Vertol CH-46 Sea Knight
 CH-113 Labrador and 113A Voyageur
 Eurocopter Dauphin - variant of Aérospatiale SA 360 Dauphin
Eurocopter Dolphin HH-65
Eurocopter AS365 Dauphin 2
 Eurocopter AS332 Super Puma
Eurocopter EC225 Super Puma
Eurocopter AS532 Cougar
 Lockheed HC-130 Hercules
 Lockheed P-3 Orion
 Sikorsky S-61
 Sikorsky S-70 Blackhawk
Sikorsky HH-60 Jayhawk
Sikorsky HH-60 Pave Hawk
Sikorsky SH-60 Seahawk
 Sikorsky S-76
 Sikorsky S-92
 Sikorsky H-92 Superhawk
 Sikorsky CH-148 Cyclone
 Westland Sea King
 Westland Wessex HC2

See also 
Air-sea rescue
Bayesian search theory
Cave rescue
Coast guard
Combat search and rescue
Crash boats of World War 2
Emergency locator beacon
Emergency management
Emergency position-indicating radiobeacon station (EPIRS)
International Aeronautical and Maritime Search and Rescue Manual
International Cospas-Sarsat Programme
International Search and Rescue Competition
Maritime search and rescue
Mountain rescue
Pars robot, an Iranian drone designed for sea rescue
Personal locator beacon
Rescue robot
Search and Rescue Optimal Planning System (SAROPS)
Self rescue (climbing)
Ski patrol
Urban search and rescue

References

External links 

 

Rescue
Search and rescue